State Highway 71 (SH-71) is a  state highway, connecting the north–south U.S. Route 95 (US-95) corridor with the recreational opportunities in Hells Canyon. It runs north from Cambridge to the Oregon border at the Brownlee Dam.

Route description
SH-71 begins on a bridge crossing the Snake River and the Oregon border. The road continues south, passing by Brownlee Dam and winding along the edge of the river. The highway turns inland, heading southeast and curving through the mountains. Eventually, SH-71 moves into farmland, and enters the town of Cambridge as Hopper Avenue, where it ends at US-95.

History

Major intersections

References

External links 

071
Transportation in Adams County, Idaho
Transportation in Washington County, Idaho